Events in the year 1805 in Art.

Events
April 17 – English landscape artist Charles Gough sets out on a walk in the Lake District. On July 27 his skeleton is found on the slopes of Helvellyn.
June – The British Institution (for Promoting the Fine Arts in the United Kingdom) is established in London by a group of connoisseurs.
The British Museum purchases Charles Townley's collection of Roman sculpture.
William Blake begins work on the illustrations for Blair's The Grave.

Works

William Blake – The Four and Twenty Elders Casting their Crowns before the Divine Throne (pencil and watercolour)
Vincenzo Camuccini – The Death of Caesar
John Sell Cotman – Greta Bridge
Jacques-Louis David – Portrait of Pope Pius VII
François Gérard
Portrait of Catherine Worlée, Princesse de Talleyrand-Périgord (1804–05)
Portrait of Madame Récamier
James Gillray – The Plumb-pudding in danger, or, State Epicures taking un Petit Souper
Francisco Goya (approximate dates)
The Clothed Maja
Portrait of Doña Isabel de Porcel
Thomas Douglas Guest – Bearing the Dead Body of Patroclus to the Camp, Achilles's Grief
Orest Kiprensky – Prince Dmitri Donskoi after the Battle of Kulikovo
Joseph Denis Odevaere – Portrait of François Wynckelman, François van der Donckt and Joseph Odevaere (Groeningemuseum)

Awards
 Grand Prix de Rome, painting:
 Grand Prix de Rome, sculpture:
 Grand Prix de Rome, architecture:
 Grand Prix de Rome, music: Ferdinand Gasse & Victor Dourlen.

Births
January 14 – Carlo Marochetti, sculptor (died 1867)
January 27 – Samuel Palmer, landscape painter and etcher (died 1881)
April 5 – Samuel Forde, painter (died 1828)
April 20 – Franz Xaver Winterhalter, painter (died 1873)
May 11 – Philipp Foltz, painter (died 1877)
July 14 – John Frederick Lewis, painter (died 1876)
July 26 – Constantino Brumidi, fresco painter (died 1880)
September 6 – Horatio Greenough, sculptor (died 1852)
September 10 – Guillaume Geefs, sculptor (died 1883)
October 23 – Adalbert Stifter, Austrian writer, poet, painter, and pedagogue (died 1868)

Deaths
February 2 – Thomas Banks, English sculptor (born 1735)
March 4 – Jean-Baptiste Greuze, French painter (born 1725)
April 28 – Charles-Antoine Bridan, French sculptor (born 1730)
May 2 – Vieira Portuense, Portuguese painter (born 1765)
May 24 – Fedot Shubin, Russian sculptor (born 1740)
June 7 – James Gabriel Huquier, French portrait painter and engraver (born 1725)
June 19 – Louis-Jean-François Lagrenée, French painter (born 1724)
July 10 – Thomas Wedgwood, English pioneer photographer (born 1771)
December 6 – Nicolas-Jacques Conté, French painter and inventor of the pencil (born 1755)
December 27 – Jean-Baptiste Claudot, French painter of landscapes, flowers and still-life (born 1733)
 date unknown
 Pyotr Drozhdin, Russian painter (born 1745)
 Thomas Hardy, English portrait painter (born 1757))
 Gustaf Lucander, Finnish painter (born 1724)
 Francesco Pozzi, Italian engraver (born 1750)
 Marie-Thérèse Reboul, French painter of natural history, still lifes, and flowers (born 1728)
 Deng Shiru, Chinese calligrapher during the Qing Dynasty (born 1739/1743)

References

 
Years of the 19th century in art
1800s in art